Brus Laguna Airport  is an airstrip serving the town of Brus Laguna in Gracias a Dios Department, Honduras. The runway is just south of the town.

See also

 Transport in Honduras
 List of airports in Honduras
 Talk:Brus Laguna Airport

References

External links
 OpenStreetMap - Brus Laguna Airport
 OurAirports - Brus Laguna Airport
 FallingRain - Brus Laguna Airport
 

Airports in Honduras